Choranthias is a genus of marine ray-finned fish from the grouper and sea bass family Serranidae. It was created in 2012 and the name  is a compound of the Greek chora meaning "room" or "space" and anthias meaning a "seafish", a reference to the broken lateral line of this genus compared to the other genera classified within the subfamily Anthiinae.

Species
There are two species classified within the genus Choranthias:

 Choranthias salmopunctatus (Lubbock & A.J. Edwards, 1981) (Salmon-spotted jewelfish)
 Choranthias tenuis (Nichols, 1902) (Threadnose bass)

References

Anthiinae